The National Family Partnership (NFP), formerly known as the National Federation of Parents for Drug Free Youth, was created in 1980 by parents across America in response to the rising level of youth drug use. It is a 501(c)(3) non-profit organization. The Partnership also assists in forming parent groups in all 50 States by providing education to parents about the health risks of drug use. Nancy Reagan was founding and honorary Chair of the National Family Partnership.

The mission of the National Family Partnership is nurturing full potential. The National Family Partnership works to accomplish its mission through parent training, parent networking and sponsoring the National Red Ribbon Campaign. "[Ev]ery year about 90,000 schools across the country participate" in  the Red Ribbon Campaign. The Red Ribbon Campaign is an opportunity to send a consistent "Anti-Drug" message to young people.

The comedian and actress, TV personality star Carol Burnett first referenced the NFP in an article about her daughter's drug use in a popular magazine ("Good Housekeeping"?), introducing thousands of parents to a nationwide effort at NFP's beginning.  The first meeting in Washington, D.C. brought together concerned parents from nearly all states in the union, to educate themselves about the harmful effects of marijuana and other common drugs of use and abuse by young people, and raised awareness of the proliferation of misleading information about these drugs in the schools and health agencies.  While in Washington, parents lobbied their U.S. senators and representatives for stricter legislation regarding marijuana possession in any amount and stricter penalties for drug dealers.  Many gained the confidence to overcome living in the shadows with a young drug user in the family to speaking out about the new studies on the hazards of drug use upon youth in particular.  Parent groups sprung up in communities across the nation to change the public perception that marijuana use was "acceptable," by educating others about the weed's effect upon the brain and reproductive organs and its long-lingering effects.

References
National Family Partnership.

Notes

Medical and health organizations based in Florida